El camino de Santiago is a 2018 Argentine documentary about the Santiago Maldonado case. It was directed by Tristán Bauer, and has a script of Omar Quiroga and Florencia Kirchner (the daughter of the former president Cristina Fernández de Kirchner). It was released on August 1, 2018.

Contents
The film begins with a contrast between panoramic images of the Patagonia and images of police repression. The case is placed in the context of the Mapuche conflict, describes the 19th century Conquest of the desert with historical revisionism and links modern governors to it. Santiago Maldonado is described as a man concerned with social issues, who made frequent journeys, and details the context of his journey to the Mapuche Pu Lof where the event took place. It makes an interview to Ariel Garzi, who made 22 seconds phone call to Madonado's cell phone on August 2, one day after his death. It also interviews Matías Santana, who claimed that he saw the gendarmerie getting Maldonado inside a truck. The documentary is narrated by the actor Darío Grandinetti, and features a new song of León Gieco. There is also an interview to Santiago's mother, Stella Maris Peloso, who does not make many public appearances.

The documentary is biased against the administration of Mauricio Macri, blaming it for the death of Maldonado. It does not reference the refusal of the Mapuche settlement to allow judge Otranto to investigate the crime scene, where the corpse of Santiago Maldonado was eventually found.

Filming
Bauer told to the press that "the film was born when a group of people—many of us very young—set out to tackle the case of Santiago Maldonado; to see who he was, to become familiar with the landscapes and places he visited and put a face to his story". It was made in the time when Maldonado was still a missing person, between his disappearance on August 1 and the recovery of his corpse in the nearby river on October 17.

Reception
The documentary was harshly criticized by minister Patricia Bullrich, minister of security at the time of the case. She said that the documentary is just an example of the Relato K, and that Kirchnerism tried to shoehorn it as a case of a forced disappearance, in order to draw comparisons between the government of Mauricio Macri and the National Reorganization Process. She pointed that some people interviewed in the documentary, such as Matias Santana, are tried for perjury.

Diego Batlle, from the newspaper La Nación, pointed that the documentary included several unpublished images and filmings, but does not provide new noteworthy information to the case. He considers that the documentary will be as polarizing in the public opinion as the case itself.

References

2018 films
2018 documentary films
Argentine documentary films
Documentary films about conspiracy theories
2010s Argentine films